Spathoglottis pubescens is a species of terrestrial orchid found from Arunachal Pradesh in India to southern China and Indochina.

Bright golden yellow flowers, 1.5 cm in diameter, with base and side-lobes of the lip with dark red markings.

References

External links

pubescens